JUDr. Josef Urválek (28 April 1910, České Budějovice – 29 November 1979, Prague) was a procurator and later judge of the Czechoslovak state court. He is known for his participation in the political processes in socialist Czechoslovakia during the 1950s. In a number of show trials, most notably during the Slánský trial, he was responsible for securing the death sentences of Milada Horáková and of 14 communist functionaries, including Rudolf Slánský, on trumped-up charges of treason.

When cross-examining the accused, he would frequently interrupt them, make intolerant remarks, and compare them to insects and the worst human waste. At Slánský's trial, he said in his final speech "I demand the death sentence for all accused. Let justice smash like an iron fist, without the slightest pity. Let it be the fire that shall burn out this nest of enemies."

After the trials he rose within the party ranks, being made leader of the highest court in 1957. He retired from this post in 1963 to join the Výzkumný ústav kriminalistiky ("Research Institute of Criminalistics") in the general prosecution. He wrote an article "Některé poznatky z výzkumu ochranného dohledu v souvislosti s prokurátorským dozorem" ("Some findings from protective supervision research in the context of prosecution") together with future Czech politician Helena Válková. He died in 1979.

This article is based on a translation of an article from the Czech Wikipedia.

See also 
 Rudolf Slánský
 Milada Horáková

References

1910 births
1979 deaths
Czech communists
Czech jurists
Czech prosecutors
Politicide perpetrators
People from České Budějovice
Collaborators with the Soviet Union
Political repression in Czechoslovakia
Slánský trial
Burials at Brno Central Cemetery